Masungbala is a chiefdom in Kambia District of Sierra Leone with a population of 28,502. Its principal town is Kawula.

References

Chiefdoms of Sierra Leone
Northern Province, Sierra Leone